Microweisea misella is a species of lady beetle in the family Coccinellidae. It is found in North America. Darkly colored and very small at about 1 to 1.5mm in length, it occurs throughout southern Canada and much of the United States. It preys on Diaspididae scale insects on blueberry and other shrubs and trees.

References

Further reading

 
 

Coccinellidae
Articles created by Qbugbot
Beetles described in 1878